The Debt is a 1999 Polish film directed by Krzysztof Krauze. It is based on a true event that took place in Warsaw, Poland in the early 1990s.

Plot
After looking for financial backing to start a business importing Italian scooters, college friends Adam and Stefan meet businessman Gerard. While initially very helpful, Gerard soon turns violent, and begins to blackmail the pair for increasingly large sums of money while psychologically terrorizing the two men. Unable to find help from the police, the two men plan to kill Gerard.

The movie is based on the true story of Sławomir Sikora and Artur Bryliński, who were later pardoned by the President of Poland because of exposure from the film.

Critical reception
Critic Piotr Zwierzchowski compared Krauze's The Debt to Michael Hanecke's Funny Games writing that both films are similar in that they convey the same sense of "powerlessness of the main characters as well as the viewers against the morality-defying spectacle of violence". Katarzyna Taras considered The Debt, alongside Robert Gliński's 2001 film Cześć Tereska, to be "the darkest portrayal of Poland's reality after 1989".

In 2000, the film received Polish Academy Award for Best Film. In 2019, Andrzej Chyra, who played one of the main characters in The Debt, received the Special Zbigniew Cybulski Award for Lifetime Achievement, the jury having emphasized in its verdict his role in Krzysztof Krauze's 1999 film.

Cast 
 Robert Gonera as Adam Borecki
 Jacek Borcuch as Stefan Kowalczyk
 Andrzej Chyra as Gerard Nowak
 Cezary Kosiński as Tadeusz Frei
 Joanna Szurmiej-Rzączyńska as Basia
 Agnieszka Warchulska as Jola
 Joanna Kurowska as Sasiadka
Przemysław Modliszewski as Młody
 Krzysztof Gordon 
 Sławomira Łozińska
 Maria Robaszkiewicz 
 Edyta Bach as Joanna
 Jakub Bach as Jurek
 Jerzy Gudejko
 Henryk Gołębiewski
 Katarzyna Tatarak
 Marcin Jamkowski
 Ewa Kania 
 Sławomir Jóźwik as Matczak 
 Małgorzata Prażmowska
 Jowita Miondlikowska 
 Jarosław Budnik
 Maria Maj
 Aleksander Mikołajczak
 Andrzej Andrzejewski
 Roman Bugaj
 Paweł Kleszcz

See also
Cinema of Poland
List of Gdynia Film Festival winners

References

External links 

1999 films
1999 drama films
Polish drama films